2015 Esso Cup was Canada's seventh national women's midget hockey championship, played April 19–25, 2015 at Red Deer, Alberta. The Sudbury Lady Wolves defeated the host Red Deer Chiefs 2-1 in the final to win the gold medal. The Saskatoon Stars won the bronze medal.

Teams

Round robin

Playoffs

Individual awards
 Most Valuable Player: Sophie Shirley (Saskatoon)
 Top Scorer: Sophie Shirley (Saskatoon)
 Top Forward: Karli Shell (Sudbury)
 Top Defenceman: Tamara McVannel (Central Plains)
 Top Goaltender: Danika Ranger (Sudbury)
 Most Sportsmanlike Player: Nara Elia (Saskatoon)

Road to the Esso Cup

Atlantic Region
The Moncton Rockets advanced to the Esso Cup by winning tournament held April 2 – 5 at the Red Ball Internet Centre in Moncton, New Brunswick.

Quebec
Quebec withdrew from Esso Cup competition for the second consecutive year. Hockey Canada awarded this berth to the Western region.

Ontario
The Sudbury Lady Wolves advanced to the Esso Cup by winning the OWMA championship played April 9 – 12, 2015 at Toronto, Ontario

Western Region
The Central Plains Capitals and Saskatoon Stars both advanced to the Esso Cup. The Saskatchewan assumed the regular Western region position and Manitoba took Quebec's spot.

Pacific Region
The Edmonton Thunder advanced to the Esso Cup by winning best-of-3 played April 3 – 5 at Edmonton, Alberta.

See also
 Esso Cup

References

External links
 2015 Esso Cup Home Page at HockeyCanada.com

Esso Cup
Esso Cup
Sports competitions in Red Deer, Alberta